Happy Land or Happyland may refer to:

Arts and entertainment:
The Happy Land, an 1873 play by W. S. Gilbert and Gilbert Arthur à Beckett
Happy Land (film), a 1943 film starring Don Ameche
Happy Land (TV series), a Philippine TV show by GMA Network
Happyland (band), an Australian band
Happyland (album), by Amanda Jenssen
Happyland (novel), a novel by J. Robert Lennon
Happyland (TV series), an MTV comedy series
"Happyland" (song), by Måns Zelmerlöw
Happy Land!, a song by Edward F. Rimbault

Places:
Happyland, Connecticut, United States, an unincorporated community in the town of Preston, Connecticut
Happyland, Oklahoma, United States, an unincorporated community
Happyland (provincial electoral district), a former electoral district in Saskatchewan, Canada
Rural Municipality of Happyland No. 231, a rural municipality in Saskatchewan, Canada

Amusement parks:
Happyland Amusement Park, a defunct amusement park in Staten Island, New York, United States
Happyland (Bangkok), a defunct amusement park in Bang Kapi, Bangkok, Thailand
Happyland Park, a defunct amusement park in Winnipeg, Manitoba, Canada
Happyland, a defunct amusement park in Vancouver, British Columbia, Canada, and predecessor to Playland

Other uses:
Happy Land, a New York City social club, site of the Happy Land fire, a 1990 arson fire that killed 87 patrons
Happyland Higher Secondary School, Rajbiraj, Nepal
Happyland, a former fresh air summer camp near Woodwardville, Maryland